Magali García Ramis (born 1946, Santurce, Puerto Rico) is a Puerto Rican writer.

Biography
Magali García Ramis was born in 1946 in Santurce, San Juan, Puerto Rico and spent her childhood there with her mother, father and brothers, near her mother's family, with close relations with uncles, cousins and her maternal grandmother.

Her father was a civilian worker in Fort Buchanan; her mother worked in her sister's laboratory for a while and later stayed home with her children. Her eldest aunt, María Luisa Ramis, was the first woman in Puerto Rico to open a laboratory and all her aunts worked there. As a teenager, her family moved to the upscale Miramar section and she and her elder brother had to change schools. She enrolled at the Academia del Perpetuo Socorro (Academy of Our Lady of Perpetual Help), where she graduated from high school.

Education and literary contributions

In 1964 she enrolled at the University of Puerto Rico where she majored in history. After graduating, she worked for the newspaper El Mundo. In 1968 she received a scholarship and moved to New York City to study journalism at Columbia University. It is in New York that she writes her first story, "Todos los domingos" ("Every Sunday").

With this story she won first prize in the literary contest of the Ateneo Puertorriqueño (Puerto Rican Athenaeum). She returned to Puerto Rico in 1971 and started to work for the newspaper El Imparcial. She worked for the newspaper until 1972. She also worked for a literary magazine called Avance until 1973. During this period she continued to write short stories.

García Ramis sent a book composed of 4 short stories to a contest sponsored by the Casa de las Américas in Cuba. She received an honorary mention for one of the stories "La viuda de Chencho el Loco" ("The Widow of Chencho, the Mad Man") which was published in 1974. That same year she moved to Mexico. She returned to Puerto Rico in 1977 and published another book of short stories called La familia de todos nosotros. She started to work for the School of Communications at the University of Puerto Rico. She routinely collaborated in several Puerto Rican newspapers.

She finished her famous semi-autographical novel Felices días, tío Sergio (Happy Days, Uncle Sergio) in 1985; it was published in 1986. In 1988, she received a Guggenheim Fellowship for her second novel, Las horas del Sur (The Hours of the South). In 1993, García Ramis published La ciudad que me habita (The City that Inhabits Me), a collection of journalistic essays that she wrote over the years, while she worked for El Mundo, El Imparcial, Avance, Claridad and La Hora.

Strongly linked to her homeland, her short stories (which she prefers were novels) are about family relations, Puerto Rican identity and the female condition, and has to be linked to other leading authors of the 70s generation, such as Rosario Ferré and Olga Nolla. In 2009 she entered the Puerto Rican Academy of the Spanish Language. She currently works in literary and historical projects and studies doctoral studies in history at the Center for Advanced Studies of Puerto Rico and the Caribbean.

Themes and influences
García Ramis's stories are depictions of Puerto Rican culture, family and politics. She writes about interactions within a family, Puerto Rican identity and women's identity.

In her best known  work of fiction, Happy Days, Uncle Sergio, she explores the relationship between a young Puerto Rican tomboy and her uncle, who is rumored to be a homosexual.

Literary works

Novels
Felices días, tío Sergio
Las horas del sur

Essays
 La ciudad que me habita
 La R de mi padre y otras letras familiares 
 Los cerebros que se van y el corazón que se queda
 Hostos, bróder, esto está difícil
 El Chango como pájaro nacional

Short Stories
 La familia de todos nosotros 
 Las noches del riel de oro
 Una semana de siete días
 En la cabaña del tiempo escondido

See also

 List of Puerto Rican writers
 List of Puerto Ricans
 Puerto Rican literature

References

External links
 Interview with Magali García Ramis

1946 births
American short story writers
Columbia University alumni
Puerto Rican novelists
People from Santurce, Puerto Rico
Living people
Puerto Rican women writers
University of Puerto Rico alumni
Date of birth missing (living people)